Nidularium innocentii var. lineatum is a plant in the genus Nidularium. This plant is endemic to Brazil.

Cultivars
 Nidularium 'Don Roberts'
 Nidularium 'Flamingo'
 Nidularium 'Ruby Lee'
 Nidularium 'Something Special'

References

BSI Cultivar Registry Retrieved 11 October 2009

innocentii var. lineatum
Flora of Brazil